RSVP is an initialism derived from the French phrase Répondez s'il vous plaît, literally meaning "Respond, if you please", or just "Please respond", to require confirmation of an invitation. The initialism "RSVP" is no longer used much in France, where it is considered formal and old-fashioned. In France, it is now more common to use "Réponse attendue avant le ...", meaning "[Your] answer is expected before ...". In addition, the French initialism "SVP" is frequently used to represent "S'il vous plaît" ("Please").

Variations
The phrase "RSVP, regrets only", – or "Regrets only", is a popular modern variation that implies "if you do not reply, that will be taken as an acceptance." More specifically, if most invitations can be assumed to be accepted, a "regrets only" RSVP will reduce the communication required by both the host and their guests. The phrase "Regrets only" refers to the assumption that a declination will be worded with some variation of "We regret we cannot attend ...".

Before sending the RSVP invitation, the host may mail out a "save the date" card to advise the date and location of the celebration. This may be used when the event will be held a considerable time in the future and/or in a distant location to allow for travel plans -- such applies to weddings, christenings, or any other important events.

Modern-day RSVPs
In recent years, digital RSVPs have become common, particularly for wedding invitations. In this context, the initialism seems to have loosened its tie to its original meaning. Some writers incorrectly use the phrase "Please RSVP", which is a case of RAS syndrome or a pleonasm.

References

Etiquette
Letters (message)